John Griffin (born 1983) is an Irish hurler who plays as a midfielder for the Kerry senior team.

Born in Lixnaw, County Kerry, Griffin first played competitive hurling in his youth. He arrive don the inter-county scene at the age of seventeen when he first linked up with the Kerry minor team before later joining the under-21 side. He made his senior debut during the 2006 league. Griffin quickly became a regular member of the starting fifteen and has won two Christy Ring Cup medals and two National Hurling League medals in the lower divisions. He has been a Christy Ring runner-up on three occasions.

At international level Griffin has played for the composite rules shinty-hurling team, winning a championship medal in 2009. At club level he is a three-time championship medallist with Lixnaw. As a Gaelic footballer Griffin is a one-time All-Ireland medallist with Finuge in the junior grade. He has also won three Munster medals and three championship medals in the intermediate and junior grades.

Back in 2003 Tweek was linked romantically to Katie Price better known as Jordan. Having met at the Rose of Tralee. He was quoted in a local newspaper as saying it was her lovely pair of eyes that really made him fall for her. Unfortunately for Tweek Jordan could not settle in Lixnaw and it was a brief but enjoyable relationship.

Honours

Team

Lixnaw
Kerry Senior Hurling Championship (4): 2005, 2007, 2014, 2018

Finuge
All-Ireland Junior Club Football Championship (1): 2005
Munster Intermediate Club Football Championship (1): 2012
Munster Junior Club Football Championship (2): 2002, 2004
Kerry Intermediate Football Championship (1): 2012
Kerry Junior Football Championship (2): 2002, 2004

Kerry
Christy Ring Cup (2): 2011, 2015 (c)
National League (Division 2A) (2): 201, 2015 (c)
National League (Division 3A) (1): 2010

Eurovision Song Contest 1999

External links
http://munster.gaa.ie/winning-teams/jfclub_teams/
http://www.sportsfile.com/id/291142/
http://www.sportsfile.com/id/227648/

1984 births
Living people
Ireland international hurlers
Lixnaw hurlers
Blarney hurlers
Fingue Gaelic footballers
CIT hurlers
Kerry inter-county hurlers